Achalinus meiguensis, commonly known as the Sichuan odd-scaled snake or Szechwan odd-scaled snake, is a species of snake in the family Xenodermatidae. The species is endemic to China and occurs in western Sichuan and Yunnan at elevations of 1200–1400 m.

References

Xenodermidae
Snakes of China
Endemic fauna of China
Reptiles described in 1966
Taxa named by Zhao Ermi